Go'natt Herr Luffare is a 1988 Swedish film directed by Daniel Bergman and based on the novel of the same name by Astrid Lindgren.

Plot
One night Sven, Anna and Stina have to stay home alone as their parents go to a funeral. Before the parents leave, they warn their children not to open the door to anybody and certainly not to a tramp. The children promise that. When Sven goes outside to check on the cat, he forgets to close the front door when entering. When it knocks outside the door, Sven automatically says "Come in". A few seconds later he regrets that, remembering the promise he made to his parents. But then it is already too late and a tramp enters the house. Stina starts to cry, because she is afraid of the man. But the tramp, whose name is Manfred, manages to calm Stina down. He tries to entertain the children, sings, plays theatre, etc. The children are thrilled and laugh about the show Manfred offers them. Thus, the tramp manages to convince the children to give him something to eat. The children want to see more and more. But when he has finished eating, Manfred decides to leave. He goes outside into the cold and the snow. The children hope he will come back soon.

Cast
Björn Gustafson as Manfred
Peter Hall as Sven
Stina Lindmark as Anna
Astrid Bräne as Lill-Stina
Lena T. Hansson as Mamma
Robert Broberg as Pappa

Background
Go'natt Herr Luffare was first broadcast on 3 December 1988 in Sweden. Later it was also shown on German television. After that it was released on DVD in both Sweden and Germany. In the German version the film was cut into 25 minutes.

Reception

Critical response
According to Filmtipset.se Björn Gustafson's performance as the tramp Manfred is fantastic. The film is very funny but sometimes also a little scary.

Bernt Lindner from Kinder- und Jugendfilm Korrespondenz believes, that Go'natt Herr Luffare can be enjoyed by both, children (aged five and above) and adults.

References

External links

Swedish children's films
1980s Swedish-language films
Films based on works by Astrid Lindgren
1988 films
Swedish short films
1980s Swedish films